Joseph Storrs Fry (1767–1835) was an English chocolate and confectionery manufacturer and a member of the Fry Family of Bristol, England.

Early life
He was born in 1767, son of Joseph Fry (1728–1787), in business as a manufacturer of chocolate and of soap, and as a type founder, and his wife Anna, daughter of Dr Henry Portsmouth, of Basingstoke, Hampshire.  His father had started a number of businesses including an experimental chocolate factory, Fry, Vaughan and Company.

Career

In 1795, he assumed control of his parents' chocolate business, now known as Anna Fry & Sons. He patented a method of grinding cocoa beans using a Watt steam engine resulting in factory techniques being introduced into the cocoa business, building a plant in Union Street, Bristol.  He moved to Grove House (now Riverwood House), Frenchay in 1800. In 1803, his mother, Anna Fry, died and Joseph Storrs Fry partnered with a Dr Hunt and renamed the business Fry & Hunt.

Dr Hunt retired in 1822 and Joseph Storrs Fry took his sons, Joseph (1795–1879), Francis (1803–1886) and Richard (1807–1878) on as partners renaming the firm J. S. Fry & Sons under which name it became the largest commercial producer of chocolate in Britain.

Death

He died in 1835 and his sons took full control of the firm, ultimately passing to his grandson Joseph Storrs Fry II (1826–1913).  He was buried behind the Frenchay Quaker Meeting House along with his wife and daughter Priscilla.

References

English businesspeople
Businesspeople in confectionery
Joseph Storrs
English Quakers
1769 births
1835 deaths